Catoptria acutangulellus is a species of moth in the family Crambidae. It is found in France, Italy and on the Balkan Peninsula.

Subspecies
Catoptria acutangulellus acutangulella
Catoptria acutangulellus macedonica (Osthelder, 1951) (Macedonia)

References

External links
Lepiforum.de

Crambini
Moths of Europe
Moths described in 1847
Taxa named by Gottlieb August Wilhelm Herrich-Schäffer